Granger Hall may refer to:

Granger Hall (basketball), (born 1962), American retired professional basketball player
Granger Hall (National City, California), historic building in National City, California, built in 1898 as an "acoustically perfect" music auditorium

See also
Grange Hall (disambiguation)